Melipotis dispar is a species of moth in the family Erebidae. It is found in Argentina.

References

Moths described in 1979
Melipotis